Suki (Suhi/Sugi/Swiggy) Sivam is a popular orator, writer and scholar in Tamil.  He hosts a TV show Indha naal iniya naal on Sun TV. He was awarded the Kalaimamani award by the Tamil Nadu state government, India, for his contributions towards Tamil literature.

Works

Motivational books 

Happiness forever (எப்போதும் சந்தோஷமே) (Eppodum Santhosame)
victory guaranteed (வெற்றி நிச்சயம்)   (Vetri Nichayam)
Food for thought (சிந்தனை முத்துக்கள்) (Sindanai Muthukal)
Learn to succeed (படிக்க ஜெயிக்க) (Padika Jeika)
They said, they said Part 1 (சொன்னார்கள் சொன்னார்கள்) பகுதி - I) (Sonnargal Sonnargal Volume I)
They said, they said Part 2 (சொன்னார்கள் சொன்னார்கள் பகுதி - II) (Sonnargal Sonnargal Volume II)
Let us live, come (வாழ்ந்து பார்க்கலாம் வா) (Vazhndhu Parkalam Vaa)
What is the answer to my question (என் கேள்விக்கு என்ன பதில்).(En Kelviku Enna Badhil)
SukiSivam Questions & Answers (சுகி சிவம் கேள்வி பதில்கள்) (SukiSivam Kelvi Badhilkal)
Success one after another (வெற்றி மீது வெற்றி வந்து) (Vetri Medhu Vetri Vandhu)
Better Dreams (கனவு மேம்படும்) (Kanavu Meypadum)
Better Family is our goal (நல்ல குடும்பம் நமது லட்சியம்) (Nalla Kudumbam Namadhu Latchiyam)
Today is the best day (இந்த நாள் இனிய நாள்) (Indha Nal Eniya Nal)
Don't cheat others, don't get cheated (ஏமாற்றாதே ஏமாறாதே) (Ematradhey Emaradhey)
Food is life (உணவே உயிரே) (Unave Uyire)
O Women you live long ! (பெண்ணே நீ வாழ்க) (Penney Nee Vazhga)
Will tell the good for the world (ஊருக்கு நல்லது சொல்வேன்) (Uruku Nalladhu Solven)
Living is an art (வாழ்க்கை ஒரு கலை) (Vazhkai Oru Kalai)
Lets live the best (நல்ல வண்ணம் வாழலாம்) (Nalla Vannam Vazhalam)
Thoughts & Happenings (நினைப்பதும் நடப்பதும்) 	(Ninaypadhum Nadapadhum)
Avoid Fear (அச்சம் தவிர்) 	(Aacham Thavir)
Mind is the key (மனசே நீ ஒரு மந்திரச்சாவி) 	(Manasay Nee Oru Mandirasavi)
Lets practise to live better (வாழ பழகுவோம் வாருங்கள்) 	(Vazha Pazhguvom Varungal)

Literary and religious books

ஆனந்தம் பரமானந்தம் (Anandam Paramandam)
கிரியா யோகா (Kriya Yoga)
மகாபாரதம (Mahabaratham (Mp3))
கம்பராமாயணம் (Kambaramayanam)
திருச்செந்தூர் ஸ்தல வரலாறு (Tiruchendur Sthala Varalaru)
oru thalam oru paadal oru nayam

Motivational videos

(Your dad's words are truth, no magic is greater than that) தந்தை சொல்மிக்க மந்திரமில்லை 	(Thandhai Sol Mikka Mandiramillai)
(Manage the challenges) சவாலே சமாளி 	(Savale Samali (VCD)
(If you know about you) உன்னை அறிந்தால் 	(Unnai Arindal (VCD)
(Mind is a magic key) மனம் ஒரு மந்திரசாவி 	(Manam Oru Mandhira Savi (VCD)
(Good family, good children) நல்ல குடும்பம் நல்ல பிள்ளை 	(Nalla Kudumbam Nalla Pillai (VCD)
(Laugh and Laugh) சிரிக்க சிரிக்க 	(Sirika Sirika (VCD)
(Are you a better parent ? ) நீங்கள் சிறந்த பெற்றோரா..?	(Nengal Sirantha Petrora (DVD)
(To improve the relationships) உறவுகள் மேம்பட 	(Uravugal Mempada (DVD))
(Grow everyday) நாளும் உயர்க 	(Nalum Uyarga)
(Today is a good day-Part 1) இந்தநாள் இனியநாள் 	பகுதி - I (Indha Nal Eniya Nal Part 1 (DVD)
(Today is a good day-Part 2) இந்தநாள் இனியநாள் 	பகுதி - II (Indha Nal Eniya Nal Part 2 (DVD)
(Today is a good day-Part 3) இந்தநாள் இனியநாள் 	பகுதி - III (Indha Nal Eniya Nal Part 3 (DVD)
(Live happily) ஆனந்தமாக வாழுங்கள்	(Anandamaga Vazhungal)

Literary and religious videos

ஒன்றே பல உருவே 	(Ornre Pala Uruve)
ஞானம் வளர்த்த மாமணிகள் 	(Gnanam Valartha Mamanigal)
திருச்செந்தூர் தல வரலாறு 	(Thiruchendur Thalavaralaru (VCD)
நல்வழி காட்டிய நால்வர் 	(Nalvazhi Katiya Nalvar)
புத்தர் வாழ்வும் வாக்கும் 	(Buddar Vazhvum Vaakum (DVD))
முருக தரிசனம் 	(Muruga Darisanam (VCD))
பகவான் ஸ்ரீ இராமகிருஷ்ணர் 	(Bhagavan sri Ramakrishnar (DVD)
திருவாசகத்தேன் 	(Thiruvasagathen)
வடலூர் வள்ளல் 	(Vadalur Vallal (DVD)
கண்ணப்ப நாயனார் 	(Kannapa Nayanar)
சிறுதொண்டர்  / இயர்பாகையார் (Siruthondar / Eyarpagayar)
கிருஷ்ணா கிருஷ்ணா 	(Krishna Krishna)
கிரியா பாபாஜி 	(Kriya Babaji)
ஆதிசங்கரர் 	(Aadisankarar)
லலிதா சஹஸ்ரநாமம்	(Lalitha Sahasranamam)
தாயுமான சுவாமிகள் 	(Thayumana Swamigal)
கவியரசர் கண்ணதாசன் (Kaviyarasar Kannadasan)
18 ஹனுமன் பெருமைகள் (HANUMAN PERUMAIGAL)

Footnotes

External links
 
 hindu.com, 19 December 2003 story
 hindu.com, 26 June 2009 story

Year of birth missing (living people)
Living people
Tamil writers